Sir Cleges is a medieval English verse chivalric romance written in tail-rhyme stanzas in the late fourteenth or early fifteenth century. It is clearly a minstrel tale, praising giving gifts to minstrels, and punishing the servants who might make it impossible for a minstrel in a noble household. Corrupt officials are central to it.

Synopsis
Sir Cleges became poor through his generosity.  He prayed that God would spare him and his wife and children.  He finds cherries ripening in his yard although it is Christmas, and sets out to bring them to Uther Pendragon in hopes of a reward.  To admit him, the porter, the usher, and the steward all demand a third part of his reward.  The king appreciates the cherries.  Sir Cleges demands twelve blows as his reward and explains about the servants.  Uther has him give them each four blows and then gives him a castle and many other gifts so that he and his family can live in comfort.

Manuscripts
Sir Cleges is found in two 15th-century manuscripts, NLS 19.1.11 and the Oxford manuscript, Ashmole 61 and were compared by Treichel. Textual comparison points to a third, lost original.

Motifs
The romance combined familiar motifs, original only in their unusual combination from different genres, which many authors have found striking.

 The figure of the Spendthrift Knight shows probable influence of the romance Amadas.
 The miracle of unseasonable fruit appears in many Celtic saints' legends, the tale of Joseph of Arimathea where his staff took root and flowered every Christmas, and The Cherry Tree Carol.
 The "Blows Shared" motif is found in Gesta Romanorum and many folktales about the world.

See also
Cligès

References

Editions

Studies
 (dissertation)

External links
 Sir Cleges a free translation and retelling in modern English of the story found in Oxford, Bodleian Library, MS. Ashmole 61

Romance (genre)
Middle English poems
14th-century poems
15th-century poems
Arthurian literature in Middle English
Christmas poems
Uther Pendragon